Boarfish is the common name of two unrelated groups of fishes:

All fish of the family Caproidae are called boarfish.
A species within the Caproidae is called boarfish, Capros aper.
Some fish of the family Pentacerotidae are called boarfish.

Additionally, Neocyttus helgae (family Oreosomatidae) is called the false boarfish.